20 bästa is a 1998 compilation album by Norwegian singer Elisabeth Andreassen.

Track listing
Morning Train
La det swinge – Bobbysocks
Together Again
Sommar Reggae (Sunshine Reggae)
Waiting for the Morning – Bobbysocks
Gå nu
Håll mig hårt – duet with Jan Andreasson
Om jag lyssnar
Take Me Away
Stjärnhimmel
Lipstick on Your Collar
Killen ner' på Konsum svär att han är Elvis (There's a Guy Works down the Chip Shop Swears He's Elvis)
Då lyser en sol
Dreamer
När jag behövde dig mest (Just When I Needed You Most)
Se på mej jag flyger
I'm a Woman
In My Dreams – duet with Mats Rådberg
Operator
Angel of the Morning

References

Elisabeth Andreassen compilation albums
1998 compilation albums
Norwegian-language compilation albums